Nothing to Prove may refer to:

 Nothing to Prove (Jeffries Fan Club album)
 Nothing to Prove (H2O album)
 Nothing to Prove (EP), a 2021 EP by Victor AD
 "Nothing to Prove" (Doubleclicks song)
 "Nothing to Prove", a song by Lonestar from the album Mountains
 Nuthin' 2 Prove, third studio album by Lil Yachty